Jose Daniel Morón is an Argentine-born Chilean football goalkeeper. He was born on September 30, 1957, in the city of Tunuyán in the Mendoza Province of  Argentina. He won the Copa Libertadores trophy in 1991 as goalkeeper for Chilean team Colo-Colo.

Morón started his career at Atlético Ledesma in 1982, but soon joined Unión de Santa Fe in the Primera Division Argentina.

In 1989, he was signed by Colo-Colo, where Morón won all of the major honors of his career.

After leaving Colo-Colo in 1995, he played for a number of other teams in Chile, including Provincial Osorno, Deportes Concepción, Palestino and  Audax Italiano.

Morón retired from football in 1998.

Titles

References

External links
 Player Profile on the Colo-Colo website 

1957 births
Living people
Chile international footballers
Chilean footballers
Argentine emigrants to Chile
Argentine footballers
Association football goalkeepers
Sportspeople from Mendoza Province
Unión de Santa Fe footballers
Colo-Colo footballers
Club Deportivo Palestino footballers
Audax Italiano footballers
Provincial Osorno footballers
Deportes Concepción (Chile) footballers
Chilean Primera División players
Expatriate footballers in Chile
Argentine expatriate sportspeople in Chile
Naturalized citizens of Chile